The 1969–70 New York Rangers season was the franchise's 44th season. The Rangers compiled 92 points during the regular season and advanced to the playoffs, where they lost in the quarter-finals to the Boston Bruins.

Regular season

Final standings

Schedule and results

|- align="center" bgcolor="#FFBBBB"
| 1 || 12 || @ Boston Bruins || 2–1 || 0–1–0
|- align="center" bgcolor="#CCFFCC"
| 2 || 15 || Minnesota North Stars || 4–3 || 1–1–0
|- align="center" bgcolor="#FFBBBB"
| 3 || 18 || @ Montreal Canadiens || 7–3 || 1–2–0
|- align="center" bgcolor="#CCFFCC"
| 4 || 19 || Toronto Maple Leafs || 1–0 || 2–2–0
|- align="center" bgcolor="white"
| 5 || 22 || Chicago Black Hawks || 1–1 || 2–2–1
|- align="center" bgcolor="#CCFFCC"
| 6 || 25 || @ Detroit Red Wings || 4–1 || 3–2–1
|- align="center" bgcolor="#FFBBBB"
| 7 || 26 || Montreal Canadiens || 8–3 || 3–3–1
|- align="center" bgcolor="#CCFFCC"
| 8 || 29 || @ Pittsburgh Penguins || 3–1 || 4–3–1
|- align="center" bgcolor="white"
| 9 || 30 || @ Philadelphia Flyers || 3–3 || 4–3–2
|-

|- align="center" bgcolor="#CCFFCC"
| 10 || 1 || @ Toronto Maple Leafs || 3–2 || 5–3–2
|- align="center" bgcolor="#CCFFCC"
| 11 || 2 || St. Louis Blues || 6–4 || 6–3–2
|- align="center" bgcolor="#FFBBBB"
| 12 || 5 || @ Chicago Black Hawks || 3–1 || 6–4–2
|- align="center" bgcolor="#CCFFCC"
| 13 || 7 || @ Oakland Seals || 8–1 || 7–4–2
|- align="center" bgcolor="#CCFFCC"
| 14 || 8 || @ Los Angeles Kings || 4–1 || 8–4–2
|- align="center" bgcolor="#CCFFCC"
| 15 || 12 || Detroit Red Wings || 4–2 || 9–4–2
|- align="center" bgcolor="#CCFFCC"
| 16 || 15 || @ Boston Bruins || 6–5 || 10–4–2
|- align="center" bgcolor="#CCFFCC"
| 17 || 16 || St. Louis Blues || 4–2 || 11–4–2
|- align="center" bgcolor="white"
| 18 || 19 || @ Chicago Black Hawks || 1–1 || 11–4–3
|- align="center" bgcolor="#CCFFCC"
| 19 || 22 || @ St. Louis Blues || 5–0 || 12–4–3
|- align="center" bgcolor="#CCFFCC"
| 20 || 23 || Oakland Seals || 5–2 || 13–4–3
|- align="center" bgcolor="#CCFFCC"
| 21 || 26 || Boston Bruins || 3–0 || 14–4–3
|- align="center" bgcolor="white"
| 22 || 29 || Philadelphia Flyers || 2–2 || 14–4–4
|- align="center" bgcolor="white"
| 23 || 30 || Minnesota North Stars || 2–2 || 14–4–5
|-

|- align="center" bgcolor="white"
| 24 || 3 || Chicago Black Hawks || 3–3 || 14–4–6
|- align="center" bgcolor="#CCFFCC"
| 25 || 7 || Montreal Canadiens || 6–3 || 15–4–6
|- align="center" bgcolor="#CCFFCC"
| 26 || 10 || Boston Bruins || 5–2 || 16–4–6
|- align="center" bgcolor="#FFBBBB"
| 27 || 11 || @ Boston Bruins || 2–1 || 16–5–6
|- align="center" bgcolor="#CCFFCC"
| 28 || 13 || @ Minnesota North Stars || 5–2 || 17–5–6
|- align="center" bgcolor="#FFBBBB"
| 29 || 14 || Toronto Maple Leafs || 3–1 || 17–6–6
|- align="center" bgcolor="white"
| 30 || 17 || Philadelphia Flyers || 2–2 || 17–6–7
|- align="center" bgcolor="#CCFFCC"
| 31 || 20 || @ Toronto Maple Leafs || 5–2 || 18–6–7
|- align="center" bgcolor="#CCFFCC"
| 32 || 21 || Oakland Seals || 3–1 || 19–6–7
|- align="center" bgcolor="#FFBBBB"
| 33 || 26 || Pittsburgh Penguins || 3–2 || 19–7–7
|- align="center" bgcolor="white"
| 34 || 28 || Los Angeles Kings || 3–3 || 19–7–8
|- align="center" bgcolor="#CCFFCC"
| 35 || 31 || Chicago Black Hawks || 2–1 || 20–7–8
|-

|- align="center" bgcolor="white"
| 36 || 3 || @ Minnesota North Stars || 3–3 || 20–7–9
|- align="center" bgcolor="#CCFFCC"
| 37 || 4 || Oakland Seals || 5–2 || 21–7–9
|- align="center" bgcolor="#CCFFCC"
| 38 || 7 || @ Pittsburgh Penguins || 5–3 || 22–7–9
|- align="center" bgcolor="#FFBBBB"
| 39 || 11 || @ Montreal Canadiens || 4–1 || 22–8–9
|- align="center" bgcolor="#CCFFCC"
| 40 || 14 || @ Toronto Maple Leafs || 7–1 || 23–8–9
|- align="center" bgcolor="white"
| 41 || 15 || @ Philadelphia Flyers || 4–4 || 23–8–10
|- align="center" bgcolor="#CCFFCC"
| 42 || 17 || @ Minnesota North Stars || 3–1 || 24–8–10
|- align="center" bgcolor="#FFBBBB"
| 43 || 22 || @ St. Louis Blues || 4–3 || 24–9–10
|- align="center" bgcolor="#CCFFCC"
| 44 || 24 || Boston Bruins || 8–1 || 25–9–10
|- align="center" bgcolor="#CCFFCC"
| 45 || 25 || Los Angeles Kings || 3–2 || 26–9–10
|- align="center" bgcolor="#FFBBBB"
| 46 || 28 || @ Los Angeles Kings || 5–4 || 26–10–10
|- align="center" bgcolor="#CCFFCC"
| 47 || 30 || @ Oakland Seals || 2–1 || 27–10–10
|-

|- align="center" bgcolor="#CCFFCC"
| 48 || 1 || Pittsburgh Penguins || 6–0 || 28–10–10
|- align="center" bgcolor="#CCFFCC"
| 49 || 4 || Detroit Red Wings || 5–1 || 29–10–10
|- align="center" bgcolor="#CCFFCC"
| 50 || 8 || Los Angeles Kings || 5–1 || 30–10–10
|- align="center" bgcolor="#CCFFCC"
| 51 || 11 || @ Los Angeles Kings || 6–2 || 31–10–10
|- align="center" bgcolor="#FFBBBB"
| 52 || 13 || @ Oakland Seals || 4–2 || 31–11–10
|- align="center" bgcolor="#CCFFCC"
| 53 || 15 || Montreal Canadiens || 2–0 || 32–11–10
|- align="center" bgcolor="white"
| 54 || 18 || Philadelphia Flyers || 3–3 || 32–11–11
|- align="center" bgcolor="white"
| 55 || 19 || @ Detroit Red Wings || 3–3 || 32–11–12
|- align="center" bgcolor="#FFBBBB"
| 56 || 21 || @ Chicago Black Hawks || 4–2 || 32–12–12
|- align="center" bgcolor="#CCFFCC"
| 57 || 22 || Toronto Maple Leafs || 5–3 || 33–12–12
|- align="center" bgcolor="#CCFFCC"
| 58 || 25 || St. Louis Blues || 2–1 || 34–12–12
|- align="center" bgcolor="#FFBBBB"
| 59 || 26 || @ Boston Bruins || 5–3 || 34–13–12
|- align="center" bgcolor="white"
| 60 || 28 || @ Detroit Red Wings || 3–3 || 34–13–13
|-

|- align="center" bgcolor="#FFBBBB"
| 61 || 1 || Chicago Black Hawks || 3–1 || 34–14–13
|- align="center" bgcolor="#FFBBBB"
| 62 || 4 || Detroit Red Wings || 2–0 || 34–15–13
|- align="center" bgcolor="#FFBBBB"
| 63 || 6 || @ St. Louis Blues || 3–1 || 34–16–13
|- align="center" bgcolor="white"
| 64 || 8 || Pittsburgh Penguins || 0–0 || 34–16–14
|- align="center" bgcolor="#FFBBBB"
| 65 || 11 || @ Montreal Canadiens || 5–3 || 34–17–14
|- align="center" bgcolor="#FFBBBB"
| 66 || 14 || @ Chicago Black Hawks || 7–4 || 34–18–14
|- align="center" bgcolor="#FFBBBB"
| 67 || 15 || Minnesota North Stars || 4–2 || 34–19–14
|- align="center" bgcolor="#CCFFCC"
| 68 || 18 || @ Pittsburgh Penguins || 2–0 || 35–19–14
|- align="center" bgcolor="white"
| 69 || 19 || @ Philadelphia Flyers || 2–2 || 35–19–15
|- align="center" bgcolor="#FFBBBB"
| 70 || 22 || Toronto Maple Leafs || 5–2 || 35–20–15
|- align="center" bgcolor="#FFBBBB"
| 71 || 25 || Boston Bruins || 3–1 || 35–21–15
|- align="center" bgcolor="white"
| 72 || 28 || @ Montreal Canadiens || 1–1 || 35–21–16
|- align="center" bgcolor="#CCFFCC"
| 73 || 29 || Montreal Canadiens || 4–1 || 36–21–16
|-

|- align="center" bgcolor="#CCFFCC"
| 74 || 1 || @ Toronto Maple Leafs || 2–1 || 37–21–16
|- align="center" bgcolor="#FFBBBB"
| 75 || 4 || @ Detroit Red Wings || 6–2 || 37–22–16
|- align="center" bgcolor="#CCFFCC"
| 76 || 5 || Detroit Red Wings || 9–5 || 38–22–16
|-

Playoffs

Key:  Win  Loss

Player statistics
Skaters

Goaltenders

†Denotes player spent time with another team before joining Rangers. Stats reflect time with Rangers only.
‡Traded mid-season. Stats reflect time with Rangers only.

Awards and records

Transactions

Draft picks
New York's picks at the 1969 NHL Amateur Draft in Montreal, Quebec, Canada.

Farm teams

See also
1969–70 NHL season

References

New York Rangers seasons
New York Rangers
New York Rangers
New York Rangers
New York Rangers
1960s in Manhattan
1970s in Manhattan
Madison Square Garden